Andy Smart (born 16 June 1959 in Southsea, Hampshire, England) is an English comedian, actor, writer and TV panel show participant.
Smart has been performing as a guest with The Comedy Store Players for 13 years now and a permanent member since 1995. Before joining the Players he was one half of the Vicious Boys with Angelo Abela. Together they won the 1984 Time Out Street Entertainer Award and later appeared on LWT's Wake Up London and Channel 4's The Tube, where, dressed as a bell boy and pretending to be a Great Dane, Smart licked Paula Yates' face. Smart currently improvises on stage every Wednesday and Sunday at The Comedy Store, London.

Smart presented American Football on Channel 4 in 1987 alongside Abela.

On The Graham Norton Show, Martin Freeman once mentioned that Smart saved him from choking on crisps using the Heimlich manoeuvre.

Personal life 
Smart has a daughter, Grace Smart, a set designer born in 1993, with actress and playwright Victoria Willing.

Smart is a supporter of Farnborough F.C. and appears on Farnborough FC Radio as a co-commentator

References

External links

 Comedy Store Players page
 

1959 births
Living people
English male comedians
People from Southsea